Don Burgess may refer to:
 Don Burgess (ice hockey) (born 1946), retired professional ice hockey player
 Donald Burgess (born 1933), retired track cyclist
 Donald W. Burgess (born 1947), American meteorologist, tornado and weather radar expert
 Don Burgess (cinematographer) (born 1956), American cinematographer
 Don Burgess (politician), Canadian politician, see 1977 Ontario general election